Rock Creek State Park is a state park of Iowa, US.  It is located in Jasper County, near Kellogg.

The  park was dedicated in 1952 and includes numerous boat launches and docks, picnic grounds, camping grounds, and trails for horseback riding and hiking. In the winter, the  lake may freeze over, and the park is a popular spot for cross-country skiing and snowmobiling.

The park's proximity to the town as well as a connecting bike path make the park a popular destination for students at Grinnell College.

Fishing is a popular thing at Rock Creek, Fish species are Black and White Crappie, Largemouth Bass, White Bass, Channel Catfish, 
Black Bullhead, Bluegill, Green Sunfish, Freshwater Drum, and Walleye. Golden Shiners also have a small population here, two large Golden Shiners were caught while fishing for panfish.

References

External links 
 Rock Creek State Park

State parks of Iowa
Protected areas established in 1952
Protected areas of Jasper County, Iowa